Ralf Brown's Interrupt List (aka RBIL, x86 Interrupt List, MS-DOS Interrupt List or INTER) is a comprehensive list of interrupts, calls, hooks, interfaces, data structures, CMOS settings, memory and port addresses, as well as processor opcodes and special function registers for x86 machines from the 1981 IBM PC up to 2000, most of it still applying to IBM PC compatibles today.

Overview 
The list covers operating systems, device drivers, and application software; both documented and undocumented information including bugs, incompatibilities, shortcomings, and workarounds, with version, locale, and date information, often at a detail level far beyond that found in the contemporary literature. A large part of it covers system BIOSes and internals of operating systems such as DOS, OS/2, and Windows, as well as their interactions.

It has been a widely used resource by IBM PC system developers, analysts, as well as application programmers in the pre-Windows era. Parts of the compiled information have been used for and in the creation of several books on systems programming, some of which have also been translated into Chinese, Japanese and Russian. As such the compilation has proven to be an important resource in developing various closed and open source operating systems, including Linux and FreeDOS. Today it is still used as a reference to BIOS calls and to develop programs for DOS as well as other system-level software.

The project is the result of the research and collaborative effort of more than 650 listed contributors worldwide over a period of 15 years, of which about 290 provided significant information (and some 55 of them even more than once). The original list was created in January 1985 by Janet Jack and others, and, named "Interrupt List for MS-DOS", it was subsequently maintained and mailed to requestors on Usenet by Ross M. Greenberg until 1986. Since October 1987 it is maintained by Ralf D. Brown, a researcher at Carnegie Mellon University's Language Technologies Institute. Information from several other interrupt listings was merged into the list in order to establish one comprehensive reference compilation. Over the years, Michael A. Shiels, Timothy Patrick Farley, Matthias R. Paul, Robin Douglas Howard Walker, Wolfgang Lierz and Tamura Jones became major contributors to the project, providing information all over the list. The project was also expanded to include other PC development related information and therefore absorbed a number of independently maintained lists on PC I/O ports (by Wim Osterholt and Matthias R. Paul), BIOS CMOS memory contents (by Atley Padgett Peterson), processor opcodes (by Alex V. Potemkin) and bugs (by Harald Feldmann). Brown and Paul also conducted several systematic surveys on specific hard- and software details among a number of dedicated user groups in order to validate some info and to help fill some gaps in the list.

Originally, the list was distributed in an archive named INTERRUP in various compression formats as well as in the form of diffs.  The distribution file name was changed to include a version in the form INTERnyy (with n = issue number, and yy = 2-digit release year) in 1988. In mid 1989 the distribution settled to only use ZIP compression. When the archive reached the size of a 360 KB floppy in June 1991, the distribution split into several files following an INTERrrp.ZIP naming scheme (with rr = revision starting with 26 for version 91.3, and p = part indicator of the package starting with letter A). Officially named "MS-DOS Interrupt List" and "x86 Interrupt List" (abbreviated as "INTER") by its maintainer, the community coined the unofficial name "Ralf Brown's Interrupt List" (abbreviated as "RBIL") in the 1990s.

The publication is currently at revision 61 as of 17 July 2000 with almost 8 MB of ASCII text including close to  entries plus about  tables, fully cross linked, which would result in more than 3700 pages (at 60 lines per page) of condensed information when printed. Of this, the interrupt list itself makes up some 5.5 MB for more than 2500 pages printed.

While the project is not officially abandoned and the website is still maintained (as of 2022), new releases have not been forthcoming for a very long time, despite the fact that information was still pending for release even before the INTER61 release in 2000. New releases were planned for at several times in 2001 and 2002, but when they did not materialize, portions of the new information on DOS and PC internals provided by Paul were circulated in preliminary form in the development community for peer-review and to assist in operating system development.

See also 
 BIOS interrupt call
 DOS API
 INT (x86 instruction)
 Malware analysis

Notes

References

External links 
 
  (NB. Delorie Software's HTML-converted version of INTER61.)
  (NB. Computer Tyme's HTML-converted version of INTER61.)

Interrupts
x86 architecture
IBM PC compatibles
History of computing